is a Japanese politician serving in the House of Representatives as a member of the Liberal Democratic Party. A native of Seto, Aichi and graduate of Waseda University, he was elected for the first time in 2003 after an unsuccessful run in 2000. He was defeated in the 2009 election by DPJ candidate Shiori Yamao.

References

External links
 Official website in Japanese.

Living people
1958 births
Liberal Democratic Party (Japan) politicians
Members of the House of Representatives from Aichi Prefecture
Japanese municipal councilors
People from Seto, Aichi
Waseda University alumni
21st-century Japanese politicians